Acetogenins are a class of polyketide natural products found in plants of the family Annonaceae.  They are characterized by linear 32- or 34-carbon chains containing oxygenated functional groups including hydroxyls, ketones, epoxides, tetrahydrofurans and tetrahydropyrans.  They are often terminated with a lactone or butenolide. Over 400 members of this family of compounds have been isolated from 51 different species of plants.  Many acetogenins are characterized by neurotoxicity.

Examples include:

 Annonacin
 Annonins
 Bullatacin
 Uvaricin

Structure 

Structurally, acetogenins are a series of C-35/C-37 compounds usually characterized by a long aliphatic chain bearing a terminal methyl-substituted α,β-unsaturated γ-lactone ring, as well as one to three tetrahydrofuran (THF) rings. These THF rings are located along the hydrocarbon chain, along with a number of oxygenated moieties (hydroxyls, acetoxyls, ketones, epoxides) and/or double bonds.

Research
Acetogenins have been investigated for their biological properties, but are a concern due to neurotoxicity. Purified acetogenins and crude extracts of the common North American pawpaw (Asimina triloba) or the soursop (Annona muricata) remain under laboratory studies.

Mechanism of action
Acetogenins inhibit NADH dehydrogenase, a key enzyme in energy metabolism.

References

External links 
 

Fatty alcohols
Polyketides
NADH dehydrogenase inhibitors
Plant toxins